Epsilon Capricorni, Latinized from ε Capricorni, is a possible binary star system in the constellation Capricornus. It has the traditional star name Kastra, meaning "fort" or "military camp" in Latin. Based upon an annual parallax shift of 3.09 mas as seen from the Earth, the star is located about 1,060 light years from the Sun. It can be seen with the naked eye, having a combined apparent visual magnitude of 4.62.

The binary system has an orbital period of 129 days.  The primary, component Aa, is a Be star that is surrounded by ionized gas that is producing the emission lines in the spectrum.  This circumstellar shell is inclined by 80° to the line of sight from the Earth.  The system is undergoing both short term and long term variations in luminosity, with the short period variations showing a phase cycle of 1.03 days.  It is classified as a Gamma Cassiopeiae variable with an amplitude of 0.16 in magnitude.

Epsilon Capricorni Aa is a blue-white hued B-type main sequence star with a stellar classification of B2.5 Vpe and a visual magnitude of +4.62. It has 7.6 times the mass of the Sun and 4.8 times the Sun's radius. The star is spinning rapidly, with a projected rotational velocity of 225 km/s. This is giving it an oblate shape with an equatorial bulge that is 7% larger than the polar radius.

The system has two visual companions. Component B is a visual magnitude 10.11 star at an angular separation of 65.8 arc seconds along a position angle of 46°, as of 2013. Component C with visual magnitude of 14.1 lies at an angular separation of 62.7 arc seconds along a position angle of 164°, as of 1999.  Both stars are likely to be unrelated and at different distances to Epsilon Capricorni.

References

External links

B-type main-sequence stars
Gamma Cassiopeiae variable stars
Binary stars
Capricornus (constellation)
Castra
Capricorni, Epsilon
Durchmusterung objects
Capricorni, 39
205637
105723
8260

de:Castra